Thanet East was a British parliamentary constituency in the Isle of Thanet, in Kent.

Boundaries
The Borough of Ramsgate, and the Urban District of Broadstairs and St Peter's.

History
The constituency was created for the February 1974 general election, when the former constituency of Isle of Thanet was split in two, and returned one Member of Parliament (MP) to the House of Commons of the Parliament of the United Kingdom. It was abolished for the 1983 general election, when Thanet East and the neighbouring Thanet West constituency were replaced by new North Thanet and South Thanet constituencies.

Members of Parliament

Election results

References

Thanet
Parliamentary constituencies in Kent (historic)
Constituencies of the Parliament of the United Kingdom established in 1974
Constituencies of the Parliament of the United Kingdom disestablished in 1983